Michelle is an album by saxophonist Bud Shank recorded in 1966 for the World Pacific label.

Reception

AllMusic rated the album with 1 star.

Track listing
 "Michelle" (John Lennon, Paul McCartney) - 2:25 	
 "Petite Fleur (Little Flower)" (Sidney Bechet) - 2:37 	
 "Girl" (Lennon, McCartney) - 2:23 	
 "As Tears Go By" (Mick Jagger, Keith Richards, Andrew Loog Oldham) - 2:10 	
 "You Didn't Have to Be So Nice" (Steve Boone, John Sebastian) - 2:25 	
 "Love Theme, Umbrellas of Cherbourg (I'll Wait for You)" (Michel Legrand, Norman Gimbel) - 2:27 	
 "Sounds of Silence" (Paul Simon) - 2:34 	
 "Turn! Turn! Turn! (To Everything There Is a Season)" (Pete Seeger) - 2:40 	
 "Yesterday" (Lennon, McCartney) - 2:38 	
 "Blue on Blue" (Burt Bacharach, Hal David) - 2:19

Personnel 
Bud Shank - alto saxophone, flute
Chet Baker - flugelhorn
Unidentified orchestra arranged and conducted by Bob Florence

References 

1966 albums
World Pacific Records albums
Bud Shank albums
Albums arranged by Bob Florence
Albums conducted by Bob Florence